The Volkswagen Corrado is a compact four passenger (2+2), three door, front-engine, front-wheel-drive liftback coupe marketed by Volkswagen from 1988 until 1995, and manufactured by Karmann in Osnabrück, Germany.

Designed by Herbert Schäfer, the Corrado overlapped and eventually superseded Volkswagen's Scirocco model. 97,521 Corrados were manufactured over the seven year production run.

Overview

The Corrado's floorpan is based on the A2 platform (i.e. Mark 2 Golf/Jetta) and, with the exception of VR6 models, all versions use the subframes, suspension, steering and braking components from the Volkswagen A2 platform model range.

The VR6 uses suspension components from the A3 model range, including the rear axle assembly and some parts of the A3's 'plus' type front axle assembly. The subsequent wider front wheel track of the Corrado VR6 necessitated the fitting of new front wings with wider wheel arches and liners along with a new front bumper assembly.

The Corrado is noted for its flush mounted windows and active rear spoiler – which raises automatically when the car exceeds  ( in the North American market), automatically retracts at speeds below  or can be manually controlled by the driver.

Variants

Launched in the end of 1988 (three years before the end of Scirocco production), all Corrados were front-wheel drive and featured petrol engines.

The Corrado G60 is named for the G Lader with which it is equipped, a scroll supercharger whose interior resembles the letter "G".

There were also two special models of the G60. The G60 Jet was an economy version for the German market only, thought to be a run out model before the introduction of the VR6. This model was only available in four colours and featured a colour coded interior. Volkswagen could not confirm production numbers for the Jet model.

Another variant is Volkswagen Motorsport (VWMS) Corrado 16V G60. Although the 16-valve engine combined with the original G-Lader was appreciated within the enthusiast community, the model never saw series production. It is generally believed that only two factory built examples were manufactured, both in Nugget Yellow.

Volkswagen introduced two new engines for 1992. The first was a naturally aspirated 2.0 litre, 16-valve  inline four, basically a further development of the 1.8 litre engine; this engine was not made available to the North American market.

In the United States, the model VR6 was marketed as the Corrado SLC (sport luxury coupe).

Upon revising the engine, Volkswagen updated the styling with a new front grill and foglamps. With the introduction of the VR6 engine, the G60 engine disappeared from the North American market after 1992 and European market in 1993. The VR6 engine provided a compromise between both V-shaped and straight engines by placing the two cylinder banks at an angle of 15°, with a single cylinder head.

This design allowed engineers to fit a six cylinder engine into roughly the space previously occupied by four cylinder engines, while closely approaching the smoothness of a straight six design. 1994 was the last model year of the Corrado in the United States.

A 2.0 litre 8-valve model  was produced in Europe in 1995. A limited edition only for the United Kingdom, the Corrado Storm, was also sold. Some discreet "Storm" badging, a colour keyed front grille, an additional Storm badge on the gear gaiter surround (an upgrade from the standard Karmann badge), 15 inch BBS "Solitude" alloy wheels, and standard fitment of some previously optional items (such as the leather heated front seats) differentiated this model from the base Corrado VR6.

Only five hundred were produced: 250 in Classic Green with a cream leather interior, and 250 in Mystic Blue, a colour unique to the Storm, with a black leather interior.

An extremely rare special edition named the Corrado Campaign was launched and produced in 1992 only and was based on the first of the VR6 models, only six models were produced with just four cars surviving as of 2022. The Campaign model was unique with Dusty Mauve Pearl Effect paint and a red brick leather interior. They were built as a prize as part of a dealer incentive to sell the most Karmann produced vehicles and all six cars were given to the top six dealerships in the United Kingdom as a bonus.

The Corrado was offered in Japan at Yanase dealerships that specialize in North American and European vehicles, offering the 1.8 L engine with either the automatic or manual transmission. The larger VR6 would have been considerably more expensive to tax, as the engine was over two liters' displacement.

Reviews
Auto Express magazine describe it as "Regarded as one of VW’s best ever drivers’ cars". The VR6 model was listed as one of the "25 Cars You Must Drive Before You Die" by the British magazine Car, and 'By far the most desirable version of the Corrado' by Auto Express.

In MSN Autos 'Cool Cars We Miss' feature they listed the Corrado among the top eight "Gone but not forgotten: a short list of cars once loved, still missed", describing it in the following manner: "The VW Corrado VR6 is coveted because of its seductive styling, road handling capabilities and its role as trailblazer, introducing the VR6 to the American market."

In 1988, in the first incarnation of the BBC television show Top Gear, racing car driver and presenter Tiff Needell reviewed the Corrado in G60 form, giving it a positive review and stating that "Handling wise, the Corrado is classic front wheel drive, and it's really very, very good indeed." In November 2003, in Series 3 of the relaunched Top Gear, Richard Hammond identified the Corrado as a future classic, "a kind of classic waiting in the wings... I think it's really rather special... the result is fantastic," but countered with the comment that it "was too expensive, and nobody bought it."

References

External links

Corrado
Sport compact cars
Coupés
Hatchbacks
Front-wheel-drive sports cars
Cars powered by VR engines
Cars introduced in 1988
1990s cars
Cars discontinued in 1995